The Bolivian Republic was one of the three constituent Republics of the short-lived Peru–Bolivian Confederation of 1836–1839. 

The Confederation came to an end three years later after being defeated by Chile in the War of the Confederation. In August 1839, Agustín Gamarra declared the Confederation dissolved.

Background 

The Peru-Bolivian Confederation was a plan that attempted to reunite the Alto Perú ("Upper Peru", now Bolivia) and Bajo Perú ("Lower Peru", now simply Peru) into a single political and economic entity. Marshal Andrés de Santa Cruz promoted an ambitious project to reunite these two territories on the basis of a confederacy. This integration was based not only on historical, cultural and ethnic reasons but also on sound economic motives. The union was trying to restore the ancient commercial routes and promote a policy of open markets.

As President of Bolivia, Santa Cruz instigated several failed plots to achieve a political union with Peru, taking advantage of that country's chronic political unrest. His best opportunity came in 1835 when the Peruvian President General Luis José de Orbegoso requested his assistance to fight the rebel armies of Generals Agustín Gamarra and Felipe Santiago Salaverry.

With Bolivian help, General Orbegoso quickly regained his leadership throughout the country and had Salaverry summarily executed. In retribution to the support he received from Santa Cruz, he acceded to the formation of the new Peru–Bolivian Confederation. Santa Cruz assumed the Supreme Protectorship of the confederation and Orbegoso maintained only the presidency of the newly created Republic of North Peru.

Administrative Divisions

The Bolivian Republic was divided into 7 departments:
 Cochabamba Department
 Chuquisaca Department
 La Paz Department
 Oruro Department
 Potosí Department
 Santa Cruz Department
 Tarija Department

References

Peru–Bolivian Confederation
Former countries in South America
1830s in Bolivia
1830s in Peru
War of the Confederation
States and territories established in 1836
States and territories disestablished in 1839
1836 establishments in South America
1839 disestablishments in South America
Bolivian Republic